Edgar Masters  (15 October 1888 – 11 August 1974) was an Australian rules footballer who played with Essendon in the Victorian Football League (VFL).

Notes

External links 
		

1888 births
1974 deaths
Australian rules footballers from Melbourne
Essendon Football Club players
Australian recipients of the Military Cross
People from North Melbourne